Benjamin Randolph may refer to:

 Benjamin Randolph (cabinetmaker) (1721–1791), American cabinetmaker
 Benjamin F. Randolph (1820–1868), African American educator, Methodist minister and politician